Nask is a village in Keshit Rural District, Golbaf District, Kerman County, Kerman Province, Iran. At the 2006 census, its population was 304, in 81 families.

References 

Populated places in Kerman County